Guldpipan officially known as SICO:s guldpipa, is a Swedish ice hockey award, awarded annually since 1982 to the premier referee in the Swedish Hockey League (SHL) as judged by the members of Sveriges ishockeyspelares centralorganisation (SICO). The award holds a high status among officials since only players are allowed to vote. Ulf Rådbjer has the record of winning the award seven consecutive times.

Winners

References

Awards established in 1982
Swedish ice hockey trophies and awards
Ice hockey people in Sweden
Swedish Hockey League
1982 establishments in Sweden